Eddie O'Connor may refer to:

 Eddie O'Connor (businessman), co-founder and chief executive of Mainstream Renewable Power
 Eddie O'Connor (hurler) (born 1964), retired Irish hurler

See also
Edward O'Connor (disambiguation)